Lawrence Kwong (born Eng Kai Geong; ; June 17, 1923 – March 15, 2018) was a Canadian professional ice hockey forward who was the first non-White and Asian descent player in the National Hockey League (NHL). He broke the NHL's colour barrier when he debuted with the New York Rangers in 1948, playing a short shift at the end of the third period. Although denied much playing time in the NHL, Kwong was a top player in senior hockey leagues outside the NHL throughout his entire career and battled the likes of Jean Beliveau for the scoring race in Quebec.

Kwong came from a Cantonese-speaking family, and was also the first NHL player from Vernon, British Columbia, and the Okanagan region. Kwong's nicknames included the "China Clipper" and "King Kwong".

After his playing days, he lived in Europe and became the first ethnic Chinese coach of a professional hockey club in Switzerland. In his later years, he returned to Canada and operated a supermarket, following his father's footsteps.

Early years 
Kwong was born in 1923 in Vernon, British Columbia, as the second youngest of 15 children born to his Cantonese-speaking father who had two wives. His father had immigrated from China in 1884 for the gold rush in Cherry Creek, BC, but later failed. His father later started farming and then went into the grocery business in Vernon, British Columbia, calling his store Kwong Hing Lung.  Larry's Chinese surname was Eng, but decided to take the name of his father's store as the last name in his English name.

Just two weeks after his birth, the government of the Dominion of Canada enacted the Chinese Exclusion Act of 1923 which completely prohibited Chinese immigrants from entering Canada. Kwong faced numerous acts of racial discrimination during his youthful years in Vernon, as he recalled being denied service at a barbershop because of his ethnic background.

Early playing career 
Kwong had practiced ice hockey on frozen ponds in Vernon and had not played organized hockey until he joined the Vernon Hydrophones when he was 16 years old. He powered the Vernon Hydrophones to the midget hockey championship of BC in 1939 and then to the provincial juvenile title in 1941. As an 18-year-old, Kwong jumped the junior ranks to play senior hockey after a try-out for the elite semi-professional Trail Smoke Eaters, who had won the 1939 World Ice Hockey Championships. In Trail, players who made the roster got good-paying jobs at a local smelter, but Kwong was denied a job because of his Chinese heritage. Instead, he was sent to a nearby hotel to work as a bellhop.

In 1942, the Chicago Black Hawks invited Kwong to training camp, but "the Canadian government refused to process the documentation needed to leave the country".

In 1944, Kwong was drafted into the Canadian Army. Instead of being deployed overseas, he was selected to join "Sugar" Jim Henry and Mac Colville on the Red Deer Wheelers of the Central Alberta Garrison Hockey League. The Wheelers defeated the Calgary Combines (starring two-time NHL scoring champion Sweeney Schriner) in the playoff semi-final, before falling to Calgary Currie Army (whose roster included Hart Trophy winners Max Bentley and Tommy Anderson) in the final series.

After World War II, Kwong returned to Trail and won the provincial senior hockey championship with the Smoke Eaters in 1946. In that BC Final series against the New Westminster Royals, Kwong led the Smokies in scoring (tied with Mike Buckna) and scored the Savage Cup-winning goal.

Later in 1946, Lester Patrick scouted Kwong and was impressed, signing him for the New York Rovers, a farm team of the New York Rangers. Kwong scored a goal in his debut for the Rovers against the Boston Olympics in Boston on October 27, 1946. At Madison Square Garden on November 17, 1946, Shavey Lee presented Kwong with the Keys to New York's Chinatown. Kwong went on to lead the New York Rovers in scoring in 1947–1948 with 86 points in 65 games.

Breaking the National Hockey League's colour barrier 

On March 13, 1948, Kwong broke hockey's colour barrier by making his NHL debut with the New York Rangers as the first non-white player in the NHL. He wore number 11, and played against Maurice Richard and the Montreal Canadiens in the Montreal Forum. This event came less than a year after Jackie Robinson shattered the baseball color line in the US. During this game, Kwong was benched until late in the third period, where he was sent to play the final shift of the game. Spending less than a minute on the ice, he tallied no points in what would be his only big-league game.

While several other Rover forwards were called to play subsequent games, Kwong was not, despite being the Rovers' top scorer. Kwong became convinced that he would not get an opportunity to prove himself at the NHL level with the Rangers, and left the Rangers organization at the end of the season. In the off-season, Kwong accepted a more lucrative offer to play for the Valleyfield Braves of the Quebec Senior Hockey League.

Career peak outside of the NHL 
Kwong went on to have a long and successful career in senior leagues in Canada and the United States. Coached by Toe Blake, Kwong was named as an alternate captain of the Valleyfield Braves. In 1951 Kwong won the Vimy Trophy as the Most Valuable Player (MVP) of the QSHL. That year, he led the Valleyfield Braves to the league championship and then to the Alexander Cup, the Canadian major senior title. In the following QSHL season (1951–52), Kwong's 38 goals were topped only by Jean Béliveau's 45 tallies. In his nine-year tenure in the Quebec League, competing against future NHL All-Stars such as Béliveau, Jacques Plante, Dickie Moore, Gerry McNeil and Jean-Guy Talbot, Kwong averaged better than a point per game. Béliveau, who later became a Hall of Fame inductee, said: "Larry made his wing men look good because he was a great passer. He was doing what a centre man is supposed to do."

Player-coaching career 
Kwong accepted an offer to play and coach hockey in England and, later, in Lausanne, Switzerland, before it even became fashionable to play in Europe. He expected only to stay for a year, but remained in Europe for 15 years. "I went there to coach ice hockey and then after six years of coaching, I decided to start teaching tennis as a tennis pro." Kwong spent one season with the Nottingham Panthers in Britain, scoring 55 goals in 55 games, before moving to Switzerland where he led HC Ambrì-Piotta in scoring as player-coach. With this coaching assignment, he became the first person of Chinese descent to coach a professional hockey team. He later coached HC Lugano and HC Lausanne. Kwong also became a tennis coach in Switzerland.

Personal life
Kwong was married to Audrey Craven (1929–1979) in Nottingham in 1964. The couple had one daughter, Kristina (Dean) Heintz. In 1972 Kwong returned to Canada with his family to run Food-Vale Supermarket (Kwong Hing Lung) with his brother, Jack. In 1989 Kwong married Janine Boyer. He was widowed for a second time in 1999. Retired from the grocery business, he lived in Calgary, Alberta. Kwong died March 15, 2018, in Calgary.

Honours & achievements
Kwong has been honoured on numerous occasions. Below is a list of select honours:

On-ice achievements 
1939: British Columbia Midget Hockey Championship

1941: British Columbia Provincial Juvenile Title

1946: Leading scorer on the Trail Smoke Eaters

1946: Savage Cup Winner; scored the cup-winning goal

1948: Leading scorer on the New York Rovers (86 points in 65 games), the top minor league team for the New York Rangers

1948: Breaking the NHL's colour barrier by playing for the New York Rangers as the first non-white player in the league.

1951: Byng of Vimy Trophy winner as MVP of the QSHL, leader in assists (51), second in points (85), third in scoring (34)

1951: QSHL Championship

1951: Alexander Cup winner. This cup is the Canadian national major senior ice hockey championship trophy.

1952: Second in QSHL league-scoring with 38 goals, only behind Jean Beliveau's 45 goals

1958: 55 goals in 55 games for the Nottingham Panthers at age 35

Awards 
2002: Calgary's Asian Heritage Month Award

2009: Heritage Award from the Society of North American Historians and Researchers (SONAHR)

2010: Okanagan Hockey Group's inaugural Pioneer Award in 2010

November 23, 2011, Okanagan Sports Hall of Fame in the Athlete category.

September 19, 2013, Honoured Member of the B.C. Sports Hall of Fame.

July 23, 2016, Honoured Member of the Alberta Hockey Hall of Fame.

Kwong's game-worn 1942–43 Nanaimo Clippers sweater hangs in the Hockey Hall of Fame as a part of its exhibit The Changing Face of Hockey – Diversity in Our Game.

Honorary appearances 
2009: Honoured by the Vernon Vipers of the British Columbia Hockey League in a pre-game ceremony

2009: Saluted by the Calgary Flames of the National Hockey League at the Saddledome.

Movies and media 
2011: Kwong's story is featured in the documentary film Lost Years: A People's Struggle for Justice (2011), written, directed and produced by Kenda Gee and Tom Radford.

2014: The Shift: The Story of the China Clipper, a documentary by Chester Sit, Wes Miron and Tracy Nagai, had its theatrical premiere in Vernon, BC.

2015: King Kwong: Larry Kwong, the China Clipper who Broke the NHL Colour Barrier, a biography by Paula Johanson, was published.

Career statistics

See also
 List of sports desegregation firsts
 Willie O'Ree, first black player in the NHL, a decade after Larry Kwong broke the colour barrier
 Andong Song, the first Chinese-born hockey player to be drafted by an NHL team (New York Islanders)
 Peter Ing, former NHL goalie
 List of players who played only one game in the NHL

References

Bibliography
 Lost Years Official Website (Episode 1): http://www.lostyears.ca/episode-one.html
 Barman, Jean.  The West Beyond the West:  A History of British Columbia (Third Edition).  Toronto:  University of Toronto Press, 2007.  .
 Cohen, Russ.  100 Things Rangers Fans Should Know & Do Before They Die.  Chicago:  Triumph Books, 2014.  .
 Greig, Murray. Trail on Ice:  A Century of Hockey in the Home of Champions. Trail:  City of Trail Archives, 1999.  .
 Johanson, Paula.  King Kwong:  Larry Kwong, the China Clipper Who Broke the NHL's Colour Barrier.  Neustadt:  Five Rivers Publishing, 2015.  .
 Ma, Adrian.  How the Chinese Created Canada.  Dragon Hill Publishing Ltd., 2010.  .  
 McKinley, Michael.  Hockey:  A People's History.  Toronto:  McClelland & Stewart Ltd, 2006.  .
 Mortillaro, Nicole. Hockey Trailblazers.  Markham:  Scholastic Canada Ltd, 2011.  .
 Poulton, J. Alexander.  A History of Hockey in Canada.  OverTime Books, 2010.  .
 Reid, Ken.  One Night Only:  Conversations with the NHL's One-Game Wonders.  Toronto:  ECW Press, 2016.  .
 Wong, David H.T.  Escape to Gold Mountain:  A Graphic History of the Chinese in North America.  Vancouver:  Arsenal Pulp Press, 2012.  .
 Zweig, Eric.  The Big Book of Hockey for Kids.  Markham:  Scholastic Canada Ltd, 2013.  .

External links

The Life & Times of Hockey Hero Larry Kwong
Larry Kwong beat long odds
NewYorkRangers.com feature on Kwong's 60th anniversary
The Longest Shot:  Retracing Larry Kwong's Giant Strides
"Rangers Call Up Chinese Puckster"
Toe Blake comments on Larry Kwong
Kwong scores in Garrison Hockey League finals
A hockey trailblazer emerges from obscurity
Learn about Larry Kwong's incredible journey to the NHL in 1948 from NHL.com

1923 births
2018 deaths
Businesspeople from British Columbia
Canadian grocers
Canadian military personnel of World War II
Canadian sportspeople of Chinese descent
Ice hockey people from British Columbia
New York Rangers players
New York Rovers players
Nottingham Panthers players
Sportspeople from Vernon, British Columbia
Canadian ice hockey right wingers
Canadian ice hockey players
National Hockey League history